The 1990 Icelandic Cup was the 31st edition of the National Football Cup.

It took place between 29 May 1990 and 27 August 1990, with the final played at Laugardalsvöllur in Reykjavik. The cup was important, as winners qualified for the UEFA Cup Winners' Cup (if a club won both the league and the cup, the defeated finalists would take their place in the Cup Winners' Cup).

The 10 clubs from the 1. Deild entered in the last 16, with clubs from lower tiers entering in the three preliminary rounds. Teams played one-legged matches. In case of a draw, a penalty shoot-out took place (there were no replays, unlike in previous years).

For the first time in the history of the competition, the final finished in a draw after extra time. In contrast to other rounds, a replay took place, but this time, a penalty shoot-out took place when that match also ended in a draw. Valur Reykjavik won their sixth Icelandic Cup, and so qualified for Europe.

First round

Second round

Third round

Intermediary round 

 7 teams advanced from the third round, but only six teams qualified for the fourth round. There was therefore a playoff match between two qualifying teams, KS and Tindastoll.

Fourth round 

 Entry of ten teams from the 1. Deild

Quarter finals

Semi finals

Final 

 Valur Reykjavik won their sixth Icelandic Cup, and qualified for the 1991–92 European Cup Winners' Cup.

See also 

 1990 Úrvalsdeild
 Icelandic Men's Football Cup

External links 
  1990 Icelandic Cup results at the site of the Icelandic Football Federation
  1990 Icelandic Cup results at RSSSF

Icelandic Men's Football Cup
Iceland
1990 in Iceland